El Líbero is a Chilean online newspaper formed in 2014. Its founders include journalist and former editor of Investigation and Politics of El Mercurio Eduardo Sepúlveda, the commercial engineer Carlos Kubick O., José Antonio Guzmán A., former Chilean minister of sports Gabriel Ruiz-Tagle, and economist Hernán Büchi.

Despite its denounced bias—identified as neoconservative by scholar Luis Navarro—the newspaper has received awards for some of its content, such as the investigation by journalist Emily Avendaño into links between Brazilian conglomerate Odebrecht and Venezuelan president Nicolás Maduro, which was recognized by the Inter American Press Association in 2018.

Origins
According to Sepúlveda, the publication's name, El Líbero, is inspired by the Italian word Libero, which means "free". Additionally, in an interview with Canal 13, Sepúlveda mentioned the Roman god of freedom, Liber, whose name refers to being able to move freely, one of the publication's goals.

Ideology and criticism
In its beginnings, the periodical was popularly known as the "right-wing CIPER". Centre-left politician Álvaro Elizalde described the outlet as a "UDI pamphlet", in reference to the right-wing party Unión Demócrata Independiente. The  far-left newspaper La Izquierda Diario has described El Líbero as reactionary. El Mostrador has linked the newspaper to former President Sebastián Piñera, noting that two of his former ministers, Gabriel Ruiz-Tagle and Cristián Larroulet, are among the newspaper's owners. After Piñera came to power, members of his government, such as Mario Desbordes, criticized the influence Larroulet had on El Líbero in attempting to exert pressure on the president to implement libertarian policies.

Notable columnists
 Axel Kaiser
 José Rodríguez Elizondo
 Alejandro San Francisco

See also
 Fundación para el Progreso

Sources

References

External links
 

2014 establishments in Chile
Chilean news websites
Internet properties established in 2014
Publications established in 2014
Spanish-language websites